United Nations Security Council Resolution 99, adopted on August 12, 1953, noting that Judge Sergei Golunsky had submitted his resignation due to his ill health and that a vacancy would exists in the International Court of Justice the Council decided an election to fill the vacancy should take place during the eighth session of the General Assembly.

The President of the Council announced that in the absence of any objection, the resolution was adopted.

See also
List of United Nations Security Council Resolutions 1 to 100 (1946–1953)

References
Text of the Resolution at undocs.org

External links
 

 0099
 0099
August 1953 events